Félix de Tarteron (March 28, 1821, Sumène - November 15, 1888) was a French Legitimist politician. He was a member of the National Assembly from 1871 to 1876.

References

1821 births
1888 deaths
People from Gard
Politicians from Occitania (administrative region)
Legitimists
Members of the National Assembly (1871)